Pinus mugo, known as bog pine, creeping pine, dwarf mountain pine, mugo pine, mountain pine,  scrub mountain pine, or Swiss mountain pine, is a species of conifer, native to high elevation habitats from southwestern to Central Europe and Southeast Europe.

Description 

Taxonomy 
There are three subspecies:
This subspecies in the Pyrenees marks the alpine tree line or timberline, the edge of the habitat at which trees are capable of growing.
Pinus mugo subsp. rotundata — hybrid subspecies, of the two subspecies above that intergrade extensively in the western Alps and northern Carpathians.

An old name for the species, is still occasionally seen, and a typographical error "mugho" (first made in a prominent 18th-century encyclopedia) is still often repeated.

Distribution 
Pinus mugo is native to the subalpine zones of the Pyrenees, Alps, Erzgebirge, Carpathians, northern and central Apennines, and higher Balkan Peninsula mountainsRila, Pirin, Korab, Accursed Mountains, etc. Also in Kosovo it is found in the Bjeshkët e Nemuna National Park.

In Scandinavia, Finland and the Baltic region, P. mugo was introduced in the late 1700s and the 1800s, when it was planted in coastal regions for sand dune stabilization, and later as ornamental plants around residences. In Denmark, Norway and Sweden, the species has naturalised and become invasive, displacing fragile dune and dune heath habitats. In Estonia and Lithuania P. mugo only occasionally naturalises outside plantations, sometimes establishing in raised bogs.

Ecology 
Pinus mugo is classed as a wilding conifer, and spreads as an invasive species in the high country of New Zealand, coastal Denmark, and other areas of Scandinavia.

Cultivation 
Pinus mugo is widely cultivated as an ornamental plant, for use as a small tree or shrub, planted in gardens and in larger pots and planters. It is also used in Japanese garden style landscapes, and for larger bonsai specimens. In Kosovo, its trunk is used as construction material for the vernacular architecture in the mountains called "Bosonica".

Cultivars 
Numerous cultivars have been selected. The following have been given the Royal Horticultural Society’s Award of Garden Merit:

’Humpy’
'Kissen' 
’Mops’ 
’Ophir’ 

Cultivars with seasonal changes in foliage color include Pinus mugo 'Wintergold' and Pinus mugo 'Ophir'.

Uses 
A recent trend is the increase in use of the mugo pine in cooking. Buds and young cones are harvested from the wild in the spring and left to dry in the sun over the summer and into autumn. The cones and buds gradually drip syrup, which is then boiled down to a concentrate and combined with sugar to make pine syrup. 
The syrup is usually sold as "pinecone syrup" 
or "pine cone syrup".

Gallery

See also 

 Pinus × rhaetica

References

Sources 
Christensen, K.I. (1987). Taxonomic revision of the Pinus mugo complex and P. × rhaetica (P. mugo × sylvestris) (Pinaceae). Nordic J. Bot. 7: 383-408.

External links

Gymnosperm Database - Pinus mugo
Arboretum de Villadebelle - photos of cones (scroll down page)
Pinus mugo and Pinus uncinata - information, genetic conservation units and related resources. European Forest Genetic Resources Programme (EUFORGEN)

mugo
Flora of Europe
Flora of the Alps
Flora of the Carpathians
Flora of the Pyrenees
Flora of Austria
Flora of Bulgaria
Flora of the Czech Republic
Flora of Germany
Flora of Italy
Flora of Poland
Flora of Slovakia
Flora of Spain
Flora of Switzerland
Trees of Europe
Plants described in 1764
Least concern plants
Edible plants
Garden plants of Europe
Plants used in bonsai
Ornamental trees